Dino Bišanović (born 13 March 1990) is a Bosnian footballer who plays as a midfielder for TSV Steinbach Haiger.

References

External links
 Profile at DFB.de
 Profile at kicker.de
 German career stats - FuPa

1990 births
Living people
People from Bijeljina
Association football midfielders
Bosnia and Herzegovina footballers
1. FC Köln II players
1. FC Köln players
FK Sarajevo players
SC Fortuna Köln players
TSV Steinbach Haiger players
3. Liga players
Regionalliga players
Premier League of Bosnia and Herzegovina players
Bosnia and Herzegovina expatriate footballers
Expatriate footballers in Germany
Bosnia and Herzegovina expatriate sportspeople in Germany